The Gacko Coal Mine is a coal mine located in the Republika Srpska. The mine has coal reserves amounting to 372.2 million tonnes of lignite, one of the largest coal reserves in Europe and the world. The mine has an annual production capacity of 0.8 million tonnes of coal.

References 

Coal mines in Bosnia and Herzegovina
Gacko